The liberalization of Bangladesh's telecommunications sector began with small steps in 1989 with the issuance of a license to a private operator for the provision of inter alia cellular mobile services to compete with Bangladesh Telegraph and Telephone Board (BTTB), the previous monopoly provider of telecommunications services within Bangladesh. Significant changes in the number of fixed and mobile services deployed in Bangladesh occurred in the late 1990s and the number of services in operation has subsequently grown exponentially in the past five years.

The incentives both from the government and public sectors have helped the industry grow and it is now one of the biggest industries in Bangladesh. As a populous country, its huge market has attracted many foreign investors.

Telecommunication
The telecom sector in Bangladesh is rapidly emerging. Bangladesh Telecommunication Regulatory Commission (BTRC) is the regulatory authority for this sector, overseeing licensing, policy, etc.

The calling code of Bangladesh is +880. There are also several SubCodes.

History

Landmarks in the history of the telecom industry in Bangladesh:

 1853: Telegraph branch under Posts and Telegraph Department, British India.
 1971: Reconstructed as Bangladesh Telegraph and Telephone Department under the Ministry of Posts and Telecommunications.
 1975: Reconstructed as Telegraph and Telephone Board.
 1979: Reconstructed as Bangladesh Telegraph and Telephone Board (BTTB) with the right to issue licenses for telecom and wireless services.
 1981: Digital Telex Exchange in Bangladesh.
 1983: Automatic Digital ITX started in Dhaka.
 1985: Coinbox Telephone service was introduced in Bangladesh by BTTB.
 1989: GENTEX Telegraph messaging service introduced in Bangladesh.
 1989: Bangladesh Rural Telecom Authority got a license to operate exchanges in 200 Upazila.
 1989: Sheba Telecom got license to operate exchange in 199 Upazila.
 1989: Cellular mobile phone company Pacific Bangladesh Telephone Limited and Bangladesh Telecom got license.
 1995: Card Telephone service introduced in Bangladesh by BTTB and TSS.
 1995: Regulatory power of BTTB transferred to Ministry (MoPT).
 1995: 2nd and 3rd ITX installed in Dhaka.fuad
 1996: GrameenPhone got cellular mobile Telephone license.
 1996: Telecom Malaysia International Bangladesh got cellular mobile license.
 1998: Telecom Policy.
 2000: Global Telecom Service (GTS) Telex Exchange venture with British Teleco.
 2001: Telecommunication Act, to establish Bangladesh Telecommunication Regulatory Commission (BTRC).
 2002: ICT Policy.
 2004: Teletalk (BTTB bMobile) cellular mobile launched.
 2005: Egypt-based Orascom acquired Sheba Telecom
 2006: NGN introduced in BTTB.
 2008: BTTB converted into Bangladesh Telecommunications Company Limited (BTCL) with 100% shares owned by Government. The Submarine Cable Project transformed into Bangladesh Submarine Cable Company Limited (BSCCL)
 2008: Japanese NTT DoCoMo bought 30 percent stake in Aktel
 2009: Bharti Airtel acquired 70 percent stake in Warid Telecom
 2009: Internet Protocol Telephony Service Provider (IPTSP) Operators launched.
 2010: Aktel rebranded to Robi Axiata Limited
 2012: 3G mobile service is introduced by state owned Teletalk in October.
 2013: 3G auction held for private companies
 2014: 64 districts covered with 3G by Teletalk, Grameenphone, Banglalink and Robi
 2016:  Robi and Airtel were merged on 16 November 2016 and Robi set sail as the merged company.
 2018: 4G auction held for private companies
 2018: on 19 February 4G mobile service is introduced
 2021: on 12 December 5G mobile service is introduced by TeleTalk
 2022: on 17 March Unlimited Validity Data service is introduced by TeleTalk
 2022: On 31 March 5G auction held for all Telecom companies

Structure

As defined in the National Telecommunications Policy 1998 and International Long-Distance Telecommunications Services (ILDTS) Policy 2007, all mobile operators are to interconnect through Interconnection Exchange (ICX) and all international calls to be handled by International Gateway (IGW) which is to be connected to the mobile and fixed operators through the ICXs.

The Interconnection Exchange (ICX) will receive all calls from the mobile and fixed operators whenever the call is made to another network and will pass it to the destination network if the call is local ,and will pass to the IGWs if the call is international. ICX will also deliver calls received from IGWs where the call is destined.

Below illustrate the structure of interconnection between different interfaces.

Service providers

Public switched telephone network
The number of public switched telephone network (PSTN) subscribers in Bangladesh as of February 2009 was 1.372 million. PSTN operators in Bangladesh include:
Banglaphone Ltd.
BTCL
Integrated Services Limited (ISL) – branded under the name Sheba Phone
Jalalabad Telecom Ltd. – branded under the name Bijoy Phone
Onetel Communication Ltd.
Ranks Telecom Ltd.
S.A Telecom System Ltd.
Westec Ltd.
WorldTel
Lenova.com.bd
Dhaka Telephone Co. Ltd. – Currently off the air, License canceled by BTRC
National Telecom Ltd. – Currently off the air, License canceled by BTRC
Peoples Telecommunication and Information Services Ltd. – Currently off the air, License canceled by BTRC
Tele Barta Ltd.  – branded under the name Jubok phone – Currently off air

Mobile phone operators

There are four mobile phone operators in Bangladesh, operating under the names of Banglalink, Grameenphone, Robi and TeleTalk. The number of mobile phone subscribers in Bangladesh as of April 2015 was 124.705 million, having risen from the February 2009 figure of 45.21 million. As of September, 2022 the number of mobile phone subscriber has risen to 181.43 Million.

Long distance operators (as per ILDTS Policy 2007)

On 25 February 2008 the Bangladesh Telecommunications Regulatory Commission awarded licenses for two Interconnection Exchanges (ICX), three International Gateways (IGm), and one International Internet Gateway (IIG) to six firms through an open auction in February 2008. The incumbent BTTB got the same licenses too. And after then on 12 April 2012, the Bangladesh Telecommunications Regulatory Commission awarded licenses for twenty-one Interconnection Exchanges (ICX), twenty two International Gateways (IGw), and thirty International Internet Gateway (IIG). Here is the list of all operators:

International Gateway (IGW) operators
 Tech Panacea
 Mir Telecom LTD
 1Asia Alliance Gateway
 Bangladesh International Gateway
 Bangla Tel Ltd
 Bangla Trac Communications
 Bestec Telecom
 BG Tel
 BTCL
 Cel Telecom
 DBL Telecom
 DigiCon Telecommunications
 First Communications
 Global Voice Telecom
 HRC Technologies
 Hub Tel
 LR Telecom Ltd.
 Lenova.xyz
 Kay Telecommunications
 Mos5 Tel
 Platinum Communications Ltd
 RanksTel
 Ratul Telecom
 Roots Communication
 Sigma Engineers
 SM Communication
 SongBird Telecom (formerly Hamid Sourcing)
 SVM Telecom LP
 Telex
 Unitrac Communications
 Vision Tel
 Venus Telecom LTD
 Carrier Voice UK LTD

Interconnection Exchange (ICX) operators
 M & H Telecom LTD
 Jibondhara Solutions Ltd.
 Summit ICX
 BTCL
 Bangla ICX Ltd.
 Agni ICX
 Apex Communication Pvt Ltd
 Carnival
 CloudTel
 GAZI Networks Ltd
 GETCO ICX
 Imam Network Ltd.
 Jibondhara ICX
 Ring Tech Communications Limited
 MicroTrade ICX
 Mother Telecom
 New Generation Telecom Ltd
 Paradise ICX
 Purple Telecom Limited
 Crossworld Telecom Ltd.
 SR Telecom
 Sheba
 Softex
 Tele Exchange Ltd.
 Teleplus Network Ltd
 Verterx Telecom
 Voicetel Ltd.
 Bantel Limited.
 Sengupta Telecom

International Internet Gateway (IIG) operator
 Aamra Companies
 1Asia Alliance Communication
 Abir Telecommunication
 Apple Communication
 Bangla Phone Ltd
 bdHUB
 BD Link Communication Ltd
 BSCCL
 BTCL
 Cybergate
 Delta Infocom
 Earth Telecommunication
 Equitel Communications
 Fiber @ Home
 Global Fair Communications
 Greenland Technologies
 Intraglobe Communications
 Level3 Carrier
 ADN International Gateway Limited. Formerly Managewell Communication Ltd
 Mango Teleservices
 MaxNet Online
 NovoCom
 PeerEx Networks Limited
 REGO Communications
 CiTYCOM NETWORK
Summit Communications Limited

Internet Protocol Telephony Service Provider (IPTSP) operators
On 18 August 2009, the Bangladesh Telecommunications Regulatory Commission commenced awarding licenses for IPTSP. IPTSP operators are regulated by the BTRC. Current IPTSP operators in Bangladesh are:

 Nationwide:
 MetroNet Bangladesh Ltd.
 Icon Infotech Ltd. (prefix-09644)
 Amber IT Ltd.
 Telnet Communication Ltd.
 Link3 Technologies Ltd. (prefix-09678)
 BDCOM Online Ltd.
 Access Telecom (BD) Ltd.
 ADN Telecom Ltd. (formerly Advanced Data Network Systems Ltd)
 Agni Systems Ltd.
 Rightsoft Systems.
 Akceycom Ltd.
 Akij Online Ltd.
 Bangladesh Export Import Company Ltd.
 Bangladesh Internet Exchange Ltd.
 BEXIMCO AND SQUARE
 BRACNet Ltd. 
 Broad Band Telecom Services Ltd.
 BTS Communications (BD) Ltd., branded as UbernetBD
 Carnival Internet
 Communication One (Pvt.) Ltd.
 Connect BD Ltd.
 Cyber Net Communications
 dhakaCom Ltd.
 Digital Connectivity Ltd.
 ERGO Ventures Ltd.
 Global Access Ltd.
 HRC Technologies Ltd. 
 Idea Networks And Communications Ltd.
 IDS Bangladesh
 Information Services Network Ltd.
 Innovative Online Ltd.
 InterCloud Ltd.
 IS PROS Ltd.
 MaxNet Online
 Manor IT Ltd.
 Link3 Technologies Ltd. (prefix-09678)
 Nreach Net (Pvt.) Ltd.
 Pritty International (Pvt) Ltd.
 Ranks ITT Ltd.
 Royal Green Online Ltd.
 X-Net Ltd.
 TeleBangla Communications Ltd.
 RED Data (Pvt) Ltd.
 Triangle Services LTD
 Premium Connectivity Limited

 Central:
 Fusion Net
 Grameen Cybernet Ltd.
 IT Connect Ltd.
 J F Optical Services
 M/s. Media & Multimedia
 Next Online Ltd. (Nextfone)
 SADIATEC Ltd.
 Sine-10 (BD) Ltd.

 Zonal:
 Chittagong Online Ltd.
 Chittagong Telecom Services Ltd.
 First n Fast IT Ltd.
 HN TELECOM

International Terrestrial Cable (ITC) operator
 1Asia Alliance Communication
 BD Link Communication Ltd
 Fiber @ Home
 Mango Teleservices
 NovoCom
 Summit Communications

Radio

Radio broadcast stations: AM 12, FM 12, shortwave 2, community radio 1, internet radios

Radios: 6.15 million (1997)

The government-owned Betar-Radio Bangladesh operates from Dhaka and other local districts. Currently, private FM radio channels are very popular. They are trying to attract young people by broadcasting music and news. The operating private radio channels include:
dhakaFM 90.4 FM
Radio Amber 102.4 FM
Radio Today 89.6 FM
Radio Foorti 88.0 FM
Radio Amar 88.4 FM
ABC Radio 89.2 FM
Peoples Radio 91.6 FM

Television

As of 2012, there are 23 broadcast television stations in Bangladesh, including the state-run BTV and BTV World, with 20 million television sets in the country.

The number of private satellite channels are growing. The first private channel in Bangladesh was ATN Bangla. There are 8 full-fledged news channels (ATN News, Channel 24, DBC News, Ekattor, Independent Television, Jamuna Television, News24 and Somoy TV).

Internet

The first connectivity in Bangladesh with the internet was in 1996. In the past few years, growth has been rapid. The government's high internet tariff is impeding the growth of this sector, claims Norwegian-owned Telenor.  Recently the government has decided to reduce the tariff by 50%.

The internet country code of Bangladesh is .bd.

As of 2005 more than 180 Internet Service Providers are operating in the country. ISP's are regulated by the Bangladesh Telecommunication Regulatory Commission (BTRC).

The number of internet users in Bangladesh as of March 2009 is over 600,000, compared to 100,000 in 2000. However, only 0.3% of the population use the internet, thus making Bangladesh the lowest usage percentage per population of the internet in the world with the exception of North Korea, Myanmar and Sierra Leone.

In April 2010 Akhtaruzzaman Manju, president of the Internet Service Providers' Association of Bangladesh, told Xinhua that the country's six cell phone operators and Internet Service Providers have so far provided over 800,000 internet connections. "We've estimated that nearly 10 million people in the country are using 800,000 internet connections on a shared basis," he said, adding the number of internet users in the country is increasing yearly by around 15-16 percent.

A 2009 study by the Boston Consulting Group found that the number of Internet subscribers in Bangladesh is likely to reach 18.3 million by the year 2020, equivalent to a 32 percent household Internet penetration, which will result in a 2.6 percent contribution to the country's GDP while creating 129,000 more jobs, the research added.

Broadband Internet access
Though broadband internet access is available, the cost of high-speed connection is higher than in other south Asian countries. Broadband internet and e-commerce in Bangladesh is progressing slowly. WiMAX service is now available from some internet service providers. In Bangladesh broadband is legally defined as 128/128 kbit/s, which is not in line with ITU standards.

The ISPs currently providing broadband services in Bangladesh are:
 Banglalion
 Infocom Limited
 InfoLink

International
There are 6 satellite Earth stations. Talimabad, Betbunia are two of them. Some info shows that the number is now 7. Bangladesh has sent its first ever satellite Bangabandhu-1 into space on May 11, 2018.

Submarine cables
Bangladesh is connected to SEA-ME-WE 4 or SMW-4 (South-East Asia – Middle East – Western Europe 4) and SEA-ME-WE 5 submarine cable systems. The landing site of the SMW-4 Bangladesh branch is located in Cox's Bazar and the landing site of the SMW-5 Bangladesh branch is located in Kuakata. The two submarine cables provide the country with redundancy to support uninterrupted internet and long-distance communications and also with a huge bandwidth. Bangladesh Submarine Cable Company Limited is the only submarine cable operator in Bangladesh.

See also

Commonwealth Telecommunications Organisation
Doel (laptop)
Media of Bangladesh

References

External links
 Media and Telecommunications Lansdcape Guide in Bangladesh, a 'infoasaid' guide, May 2012, 135 pp.